Jan Marmenout (born in Ghent, Belgium) is a Belgian percussionist and multi-instrumentalist playing such instruments as the berimbau, kalimba, balafon, didgeridoo, shawm, Tibetan trumpet, conch shells, fujara, lithophones, etc. He is perhaps most-known for his compositions on the fujara, an ethnic instrument from Slovakia. Marmenout plays the fujara in an intuitive and non-traditionalist way.

He has composed the score for two movies, Judentransport XX (2003) and Desperado (2002).

Discography
 Gates, Highgate Music, 1997.
 Fujara, Highgate Music, 1998.
 Spirits, Highgate Music, 1999, with Vidna Obmana.
 Wastelands, Highgate Music, 2005, with Lode Vercampt.
 A Special Blend (Fujara II), Highgate Music, 2005

External links
 Personal Website
 At Highgate Music
 On Fujara Slovakia
 

Living people
Year of birth missing (living people)